Mansuwala is a village in the Punjab province of Pakistan. It is located at 30°46'50N 74°13'10E with an altitude of 176 metres (580 feet).

References 

Villages in Punjab, Pakistan